is a 1995 video game for the Super Famicom, developed by Tomcat System, and jointly published by Tomy and Ape. It was not released outside of Japan.

This game is the sequel to a 1993 Super Famicom game called Monopoly, which was published by Tomy and developed by Ape and CreamSoft (not to be confused with the 1991 Monopoly game by Sculptured Software). It was likewise Japan only.

Aside from co-developing the game, Ape also wrote a complete guidebook to it with rules and tactics. It was released in May 1995 by book publishing company Aspect (not to be confused with the game development company Aspect).

Reception
On release, Famicom Tsūshin gave the game 30 points out of 40.

References

External links
 GameSpot (archived)
 Gameplay video on YouTube

1995 video games
Japan-exclusive video games
Monopoly video games
Multiplayer and single-player video games
Super Nintendo Entertainment System games
Super Nintendo Entertainment System-only games
Tomcat System games
Tomy games
Video game sequels
Video games developed in Japan